Mychajlo Serhiyovych Dmytrenko (November 9, 1908, Lokhvytsi, Poltava, Russian Empire – March 8, 1997) was a Ukrainian-American painter of world recognition.

Dmytrenko settled in Detroit and examples of his work can be found there. Along with his other works Dmytrenko was responsible for the interior design of the St. George Ukrainian Catholic Church in the East Village, Manhattan between 1977 and 1989.

Education
He graduated from the Kyiv State Art Institute in 1930, where he studied with Fedir Krychevsky.≠

References

External links
Model for proposed monument to the Ukrainian bard Taras H. Shevchenko by Mykhailo Dmytrenko in the Ukrainian American Archives & Museum of Detroit

1908 births
1996 deaths
20th-century Ukrainian painters
20th-century Ukrainian male artists
People from Lokhvytsia
Soviet emigrants to the United States
Ukrainian male painters